Frank Watson Hunger (born July 22, 1936) is an American attorney who served as the United States Assistant Attorney General for the Civil Division from 1993 to 1999. The son-in-law of Al Gore Sr. and brother-in-law of Al Gore during his marriage to Nancy Gore, Hunger was considered one of Gore's closest confidantes and friends.

Biography 
Hunger was born in Winona, Mississippi on July 22, 1936. Hunger received a Bachelor of Business Administration (B.B.A.) degree from the University of Mississippi and his LL.B. from the Duke University School of Law.

References

1936 births
Living people
United States Assistant Attorneys General for the Civil Division
University of Mississippi alumni
Duke University School of Law alumni
United States Department of Justice officials
People from Winona, Mississippi